United Prosperity is a not-for-profit Web-based microcredit organisation.

Unlike most microcredit or person-to-person lending organisations, United Prosperity does not directly lend to the micro-entrepreneur, but instead the micro-loans are used to provide a guarantee to a local bank, which lends to the micro-entrepreneur. Typically the local bank will lend about twice the amount provided by the micro-lender's guarantee, thus providing greater leverage than traditional micro-credit.

Another claimed benefit of this approach is that the micro-entrepreneur develops a relationship and, most importantly, a credit history with their local bank, enabling the micro-entrepreneur to become independent of the micro-lenders in the long term. A criticism of traditional microcredit models is that they can create a long-term dependency between the micro-lenders and the micro-entrepreneur as the micro-entrepreneur never builds a relationship with local banks.

As of mid-2022, the unitedprosperity.org domain name is up for sale.

References

External links
Official Website

Microfinance organizations
Peer-to-peer charities
Peer-to-peer lending companies